Morten Lauridsen Hyldgaard (born 26 January 1978) is a Danish former professional footballer who played as goalkeeper. He played for a number of clubs in English football. He played four games for the Denmark national under-21 football team.

Career
He started his career with Ikast FS. He played for a while in England, signing with Coventry City in 1999, but he found first team chances rare and spent time on loan with Scunthorpe United and later Grimsby Town. He then had a spell in Scotland with Hibernian before returning to England with Luton Town.

He decided to end his career in 2004, but made a comeback with Danish club Esbjerg fB under manager Ove Pedersen. In 2006, he joined Pedersen at AGF, where he ended his career in 2009.

References

External links
National team profile
Danish Superliga statistics

1978 births
Living people
People from Herning Municipality
Association football goalkeepers
Danish men's footballers
Denmark under-21 international footballers
Coventry City F.C. players
Barry Town United F.C. players
Scunthorpe United F.C. players
Grimsby Town F.C. players
Ikast FS players
Hibernian F.C. players
Luton Town F.C. players
Esbjerg fB players
Aarhus Gymnastikforening players
Danish Superliga players
English Football League players
Danish expatriate men's footballers
Expatriate footballers in England
Expatriate footballers in Scotland
Danish expatriate sportspeople in England
Danish expatriate sportspeople in Scotland
Sportspeople from the Central Denmark Region